The Governor of Cork was a military officer who commanded the garrison at Cork in Ireland. The office became a sinecure and in 1833 was abolished from the next vacancy.

List of governors of Cork

Governors
1644: Major Muschamp 
1651: Colonel Robert Phaire (for Parliament)  (page 175)
1672: Francis Boyle, 1st Viscount Shannon
1678: Richard Boyle, 2nd Viscount Shannon
1689: Daniel O'Brien, 3rd Viscount Clare and M. Boileau (for King James II) 
1690: Richard Power, 1st Earl of Tyrone and Roger McElligott (for King James II)
1690: Colonel Hales and Colonel Hastings (for King William) 
1691: Charles Boyle, 2nd Earl of Burlington
1691: Sir Richard Cox 
1692: Sir Toby Purcell
1698: Sir James Jeffreys
1698–1700: Position abolished
1701: Sir James Jeffreys
1722: James Jeffreys (son of above) 
1746–?1750: Gervais Parker
1752–1764: Lieut-General Sir James St Clair
1764–1768: Lord Robert Bertie
1768–1778: Col. John Wynne
1778–1782: Nicholas Lysaght
1782–1789: Thomas Pigott
1789–1792: Mountifort Longfield
1792–1811: The Earl of Massereene
1811–1820: The Lord Beresford
1820–1828: Sir Brent Spencer
1829–1835: Sir William Inglis

Lieutenant-governors

c.1760–1765?: James Molesworth
1764–1768: John Wynne
1768–1769: James St John Jeffereyes
1772–1778: William Hull a.k.a. William Tonson, 1st Baron Riversdale 
1778–: John Leland
1796–1808: John Leland
1808–1815: Col. William Dickson 
1815–1834: James Stirling

References

History of Cork (city)
Cork